Javier "Javi" Fernández Hernández (born 3 August 1997) is a Spanish footballer who plays as a central defender for San Fernando CD. Javi is currently engaged to a doctor from Mallorca Dra. Julia Soubrier

Club career
Born in Cartagena, Murcia Fernández joined UCAM Murcia CF's youth setup in 2015, from Elche CF. On 22 June 2016, after finishing his formation, he renewed his contract and was assigned to the reserves in Tercera División.

Fernández made his senior debut on 21 August 2016, starting in a 4–0 home routing of EDMF Churra. He scored his first goal on 6 November, but in a 1–2 loss at Lorca FC B.

On 18 July 2017, Fernández was promoted to the main squad in Segunda División B. A backup option in 2017–18, he became an undisputed starter in 2018–19.

On 2 July 2019, Fernández signed a three-year contract with Segunda División side Real Oviedo. He made his professional debut on 24 August, starting in a 1–1 home draw against CD Lugo.

On 31 January 2020, after featuring sparingly, Fernández moved to Villarreal CF B on loan for the remainder of the season. On 20 September, he terminated his contract with the Carbayones, and agreed to a three-year deal with San Fernando CD just hours later.

References

External links

1997 births
Living people
Sportspeople from Cartagena, Spain
Spanish footballers
Footballers from the Region of Murcia
Association football defenders
Segunda División players
Segunda División B players
Tercera División players
UCAM Murcia CF B players
UCAM Murcia CF players
Real Oviedo players
Villarreal CF B players
San Fernando CD players